Pia Christina Miller Getty (born 1966) is a socialite and heiress.

Early life
She is the oldest daughter of Robert Warren Miller, an American-born British businessman, and wife María Clara "Chantal" Pesantes Becerra, an Ecuadorian, and sister of Crown Princess Marie-Chantal of Greece and Denmark and Princess Alexandra von Fürstenberg, a trio famously dubbed "the Miller Sisters".

Getty spent her childhood in Hong Kong and attended Le Rosey School in Switzerland. She briefly attended Barnard College in New York and later studied art history at Georgetown University.

Career
Getty is the American spokeswoman for the cosmetics company Sephora. She is frequently featured in Vogue, Vanity Fair, and other society magazines.

Her first feature documentary film, China Power - Art Now After Mao, released in 2008, focused on China's burgeoning art scene.

Personal life
In 1992, in Bali, she married Getty Oil heir Christopher Ronald Getty, son of Jean Ronald Getty and grandson of Jean Paul Getty. The couple have four children, Isabel (b. 11 November 1993), Robert Maximilian (b. 30 April 1996), Conrad (b. 17 March 1998), and Maximus Aurelius (b. 1 April 2002). They divorced in 2005. She is the godmother of her niece, Princess Maria-Olympia of Greece and Denmark.

Ancestry

References

External links
 
 Filmmaker profile
 Some ancestry of the Miller family

1966 births
Living people
Alumni of Institut Le Rosey
Georgetown University alumni
American socialites
American expatriates in Switzerland
American expatriates in Hong Kong
Pia
Miller family
American documentary filmmakers
American people of Canadian descent
American people of Ecuadorian descent
Film directors from New York City
Hispanic and Latino American film directors
American women documentary filmmakers